The office of Prime Minister of Iran was established in 1906 during the Persian Constitutional Revolution, and existed until 1989 when the office was abolished after a constitutional referendum. The prime minister was the head of government of Iran.

Moshir al-Dowleh was the first and Mir-Hossein Mousavi was the last prime minister of Iran. Before the Constitutional Revolution, the head of government was called Grand Vizier (Sadr-e A'zam or Vazir-e A'zam).

List
Political party key

See also
Prime Minister of Iran
List of grand viziers of Persia
President of Iran
List of presidents of Iran
List of vice presidents of Iran
List of speakers of the Parliament of Iran

References

Sources
 
 
 
 
  However, the birth year indicated there (1858) does not agree with his WorldCat entry and with his VIAF entry, both of which give 1857.

 
Iran, List of prime ministers of
Prime ministers